Mohamed Hassan Adam is a Somali politician. He is the State Minister for Commerce and Industry of Somalia, having been appointed to the position on 6 February 2015 by Prime Minister Omar Abdirashid Ali Sharmarke He is the longest serving Minister in the current Somali government and has been in the cabinet since 2009 with the previous President.

References

Living people
Government ministers of Somalia
Year of birth missing (living people)